A rumble seat (American English), dicky (dickie/dickey) seat (British English), also called a mother-in-law seat, is an upholstered exterior seat which folded into the rear of a coach, carriage, or early motorcar.  Depending on its configuration, it provided exposed seating for one or two passengers.

History
Additional occasional seating appeared in the latter centuries of evolution of the coach and carriage. The 1865 edition of Webster's An American Dictionary of the English Language defines a dickie seat or rumble as "A boot with a seat above it for servants, behind a carriage." Similar to the dickie seat on European phaetons was the spider, a small single seat or bench on spindly supports for seating a groom or footman. 

Before World War I, dickie or rumble seats did not always fold into the bodywork. Following it, such optional passenger arrangements typically were integrated into the rear deck. When unoccupied, the remaining space, if any, under the seat's lid could be used for storing luggage.

Roadster, coupe and cabriolet car body styles were offered with either a luggage compartment or a rumble seat in the deck. Models equipped with a rumble seat were often referred to as a sport coupe or sport roadster.

Rumble seat passengers were exposed to the elements, and received little or no protection from the regular passenger compartment top. Folding tops and side curtains for rumble seats were available for some cars (including the two-door version of the Ford Model A) but never achieved much popularity. Among the last American-built cars with a rumble seat were the 1938 Chevrolet, the 1939 Ford and 1939 Dodge and Plymouth.
The last British built car with a dickey seat was the Triumph 2000 Roadster made until 1949.

See also 
 Car seat
 Folding seat
 List of chairs
 Subaru BRAT, which used a similar seating configuration when sold in North America to avoid the chicken tax.

Notes

References

Further reading

Auto parts
Automotive accessories
Seats